Tranmere is a rural residential locality in the local government area (LGA) of Clarence in the Hobart LGA region of Tasmania. The 2016 census recorded a population of 1701 for the state suburb of Tranmere.
It is a suburb of greater Hobart. It is accessed from, and shares a border with Howrah, which lies to its north. Rokeby lies to its east.

Tranmere is a riverside suburb, with views across the Derwent River to the Hobart city centre.

History 
Tranmere was gazetted as a locality in 1970. It may have been named for a ship which brought livestock from England in 1827.

Geography
The waters of the River Derwent estuary form the western and southern boundaries.

Road infrastructure 
Route B33 (South Arm Highway) passes to the north. From there, Oceana Drive and Tranmere Road provide access to the locality.

References

Suburbs of Hobart
Localities of City of Clarence